Uwe Spies (born July 8, 1967 in Riedlingen) is a German former professional footballer who played as a striker.

Honours
SC Freiburg
 Bundesliga third place: 1994–95

MSV Duisburg
 DFB-Pokal finalist: 1997–98

References

1967 births
Living people
People from Riedlingen
Sportspeople from Tübingen (region)
Association football forwards
German footballers
SSV Ulm 1846 players
SC Freiburg players
MSV Duisburg players
Bundesliga players
2. Bundesliga players
Footballers from Baden-Württemberg
West German footballers